Nikolaus Geyrhalter (born 1972) is an Austrian filmmaker. He has directed, produced, written, and worked as cinematographer for numerous documentaries. He has won awards for Das Jahr nach Dayton (1997), Pripyat (1999), Elsewhere (2001), and Our Daily Bread (2005).

Life and career 
Geyrhalter was born in Vienna, Austria in 1972. He formed his own production company at 22 years old. His first documentary was the 1994 film Washed Ashore (German: Angeschwemmt), about life on the Danube. He also filmed Pripyat (1999), a black-and-white look at residents who live near the Chernobyl Exclusion Zone in Ukraine. Elsewhere (2001) was a travelogue to a dozen different places around the world, and Our Daily Bread (2005) explored mechanical food production. 7915 Km (2008) looks at the Dakar Rally and the lives of racers and locals.

Filmography
Eisenerz (1992) – director
Angeschwemmt (1994) – director, producer, writer, cinematographer
Das Jahr nach Dayton (1997) – director, writer, cinematographer
Pripyat (1999) – director, producer, writer, cinematographer
Elsewhere (2001) – director, producer, writer, cinematographer
Fremde Kinder (2003) – director, producer, writer, cinematographer
Our Daily Bread (2005) – director, producer, writer, cinematographer
7915 Km (2008) – director, producer, cinematographer
Allentsteig (2010) – director
Abendland (2011) – director, producer, writer, cinematographer
Donauspital (2012) – director, producer, writer, cinematographer
Homo Sapiens (2016) – director, producer, cinematographer 
Die Bauliche Massnahme (2018) – director, producer, cinematographer
Earth (2019) – director, producer, cinematographer
Matter Out of Place (2022) – director

References

External links
Postcards from Elsewhere at L Magazine

films of Nikolaus Geyrhalter on Dafilms.com

1972 births
Living people
Austrian cinematographers
Austrian documentary film directors
Austrian film producers